Keep It Hid is the debut solo album by the American blues-rock musician Dan Auerbach of the Black Keys, released in 2009 on Nonesuch Records. The second track, "I Want Some More", was featured in season 2, episode 2 of Peaky Blinders. "Heartbroken, in Disrepair" was featured on the 2011 video game Need for Speed: The Run. The final track, "Goin' Home", was included in the soundtrack of the 2009 film Up in the Air.

Track listing
All songs written by Dan Auerbach, except where noted.
 "Trouble Weighs a Ton" – 2:19
 "I Want Some More" (Wayne Carson Thompson) – 3:49
 "Heartbroken, in Disrepair" – 3:21
 "Because I Should" (D. Auerbach, Mark Neill) – 0:53
 "Whispered Words (Pretty Lies)" (Charles Auerbach) – 4:06
 "Real Desire" – 4:26
 "When the Night Comes" (D. Auerbach, C. Auerbach) – 4:11
 "Mean Monsoon" – 3:47
 "The Prowl" – 3:18
 "Keep It Hid" – 3:41
 "My Last Mistake" – 3:14
 "When I Left the Room" – 4:02
 "Street Walkin'" – 3:52
 "Goin' Home" – 4:57

Personnel
Dan Auerbach – lead and backing vocals, lead and rhythm guitar, piano, organ, synthesizer, bass, drums, percussion, drum loops, sound effects, producer
Bob Cesare – drums on tracks (2, 3, 5, 8-13), rhythm guitar on "Goin' Home
Dave Huddleston – upright bass on "Whispered Words"
Rob "Thorny" Thorsen – upright bass on "Mean Monsoon" 
James Quine – electric rhythm guitar on "Mean Monsoon" and "Street Walkin'",harmony vocals on "Trouble Weighs A Ton" and "Heartbroken, in Disrepair"
Jessica Lea Mayfield – harmony vocals on "When the Night Comes"
Mark Neill – maracas on "Heartbroken, in Disrepair"
James Quine – photography
Amy Burrows – album cover design
Bob Cesare – assistant engineer
Mark Neill – mixer
Jim Demain – mastering

Tracks 4 and 7 recorded and engineered by Mark Neill for Soil of the South Productions

Charts

References 

2009 debut albums
Dan Auerbach albums
Nonesuch Records albums